Nima Nourizadeh (born 12 November 1977) is a British-Iranian film, music video, and commercials director. Nourizadeh is the son of political activist Alireza Nourizadeh and his siblings are electronic music producers Omid 16B and Navid.

Career 
Nourizadeh has directed music videos for Dizzee Rascal, Pink Grease, Franz Ferdinand, Bat for Lashes, Santigold, Hot Chip, Yelle and Lily Allen. In 2008, he won Best Director at the UK Music Video Awards.  He also directed commercials for Adidas and is currently signed as a commercial director at international production company SMUGGLER.

His debut film, Project X, released in March 2012, was nominated for 3 MTV Movie awards. His second film was the 2015 action comedy American Ultra, starring Jesse Eisenberg, Kristen Stewart, Connie Britton, John Leguizamo, and Topher Grace.

Nourizadeh is set to direct two episodes of the second season of Gangs of London, a British action-crime drama television series for AMC.

Filmography
Film
 Project X (2012)
 American Ultra (2015)

Television
Little America – Episode: "The Rock" (2020) 
Gangs of London – 2 Episodes (TBD)

Music videos

References

External links

1977 births
Living people
Alumni of Central Saint Martins
British film editors
British film directors
British music video directors
Iranian emigrants to the United Kingdom
People from Tehran